= NGC 4814 =

Galaxy in the constellation Ursa Major

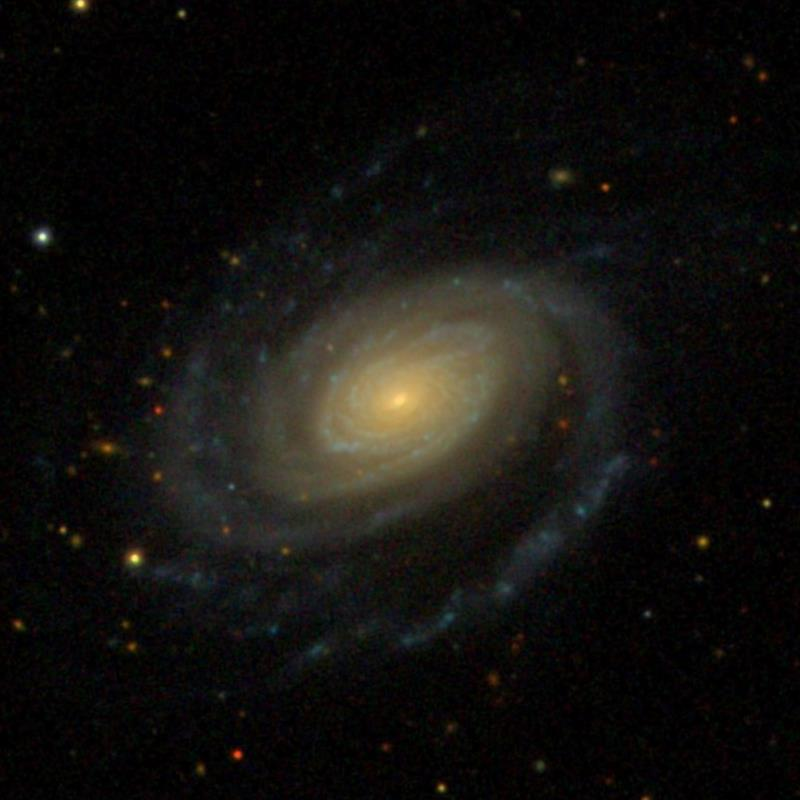

Observation data (J2000 epoch)
- Constellation: Ursa Major
- Right ascension: 12^{h} 56^{m} 28^{s}
- Declination: +58° 12′ 13″
- Redshift: 0.008408±0.000013
- Apparent magnitude (V): 12.2

Other designations
- UGC 08051 CGCG 293-044 CGCG 294-003 CGCG 1253.2+5836

NGC 4814 is a spiral galaxy located in the constellation Ursa Major. It was discovered on March 17, 1790, by the astronomer William Herschel.
